High Society is the second album from the band Enon. It was released June 4, 2002 on Touch and Go Records.

Track listing
 "Old Dominion" – 3:02
 "Count Sheep" – 3:02
 "In This City" – 4:01
 "Window Display" – 3:11
 "Native Numb" – 2:33
 "Leave It to Rust" – 3:02
 "Disposable Parts" – 1:54
 "Sold!" – 2:21
 "Shoulder" – 2:39
 "Pleasure and Privilege" – 1:58
 "Natural Disasters" – 2:49
 "Carbonation" – 2:52
 "Salty" – 2:27
 "High Society" – 3:12
 "Diamond Raft" – 2:21

References

External links
Enon.tv official website
Enon on MySpace
Touch and Go/Quarterstick Records
Touch and Go/Quarterstick Records on MySpace

2002 albums
Albums produced by Dave Sardy
Touch and Go Records albums
Enon (band) albums